Cyana nemasisha is a moth of the  family Erebidae. It was described by Roesler in 1990. It is found in Kenya, Mozambique, Rwanda, South Africa, Tanzania, Uganda, Zambia and Zimbabwe.

References

Cyana
Moths described in 1990
Insects of Tanzania
Moths of Africa